BC Dnipro-Azot was a Ukrainian basketball club based in Dniprodzerzhynsk. Established in 2005, the team played in the Superleague. It was dissolved in 2015, ten years after its foundation. Its team colors were red and white.

Season by season

External links
Official website

Defunct basketball teams in Ukraine
Sport in Kamianske
Basketball teams established in 2005
Basketball teams disestablished in 2015
2005 establishments in Ukraine
2015 disestablishments in Ukraine